Sir David Wing-cheung Tang,  (2 August 1954 – 29 August 2017), was a Hong Kong businessman, philanthropist and socialite. He was best known for founding the Shanghai Tang fashion chain in 1994, which he sold in 1998 to Richemont.

Early life and education
Tang was born into a prominent, affluent family in Hong Kong. His grandfather, Sir Shiu-Kin Tang (鄧肇堅), co-founded the Kowloon Motor Bus Company and was considered "one of Hong Kong's greatest philanthropists". At the age of 12, he moved with his parents to England. Following his primary education at La Salle Primary School, Tang was sent to board at The Perse School, Cambridge: he later claimed that he was then "aged 13, hardly able to speak a word of English". After leaving Perse in 1973 he went to King's College London to read Philosophy and then Law.

Career
Tang started his career at his grandfather's solicitor firm. He joined the London law firm Macfarlanes as a trainee solicitor, where he was described by the then senior partner Vanni Treves as being "confident, quick witted and funny", as well as being "charmingly undisciplined and unreliable".  By mutual agreement he left the firm after a couple of months without completing his training contract, and instead changed career path and joined Swire Pacific Limited. He was the founder of the China Club in Hong Kong, Beijing, and Singapore the Shanghai Tang stores, Havana House and Pacific Cigar Company Ltd (the exclusive distributor for all Cuban cigars in Asia Pacific). More recently Tang opened the Cipriani in Hong Kong and the China Tang restaurant at the Dorchester Hotel. Tang was also a director and advisor to a number of boards, including Tommy Hilfiger.

In 1983–84, Tang taught English literature and philosophy at Peking University in Beijing, China.

Awards
Tang was promoted from OBE to Knight Commander of the Order of the British Empire (KBE) in the 2008 New Year Honours. He was also honoured by the French Government as Chevalier of the Ordre des Arts et des Lettres (1995). He received the award for Outstanding Achievement in Art and Design at the Asian Awards in 2014.

Other roles
Sir David was the Honorary Consul of Cuba in Hong Kong. From time to time, he contributed articles for newspapers.

Tang was invited to provide a weekly English column for the Chinese-language Hong Kong newspaper Apple Daily.  A selection of his articles has been published in a book An Apple a Week (published in 2006). He also contributed an "agony uncle" column to the weekend Financial Times, in which he responded to readers' social dilemmas.

In 2011, Tang founded a website, ICorrect.com, where celebrities can post fixes and refutations of incorrect information spreading over the internet.

Support for Hong Kong democracy
Tang was unrestrained in speaking, at times scathingly, in opposition to the Hong Kong Government. He was particularly incensed by its intransigence on democratic reform. In a speech, on 18 February 2016, to the Foreign Correspondents Club, Hong Kong, in reference to the Chief Executive's policy address, he said,

"Whoever wrote that first sentence for the chief executive, if he himself did not write it, must be a comedian; or perhaps a monkey who accidentally typed up those words on a typewriter. What it all means to me is the disingenuousness of our chief executive and government, and the contempt with which they hold us, the citizens of Hong Kong.  ... Our government has been growing apart from the people of Hong Kong and they must anticipate trouble. Already, there are over one million people in Hong Kong who are trapped by poverty, and they cannot be too pleased about the government. It is simply invidious that in a prosperous community such as Hong Kong, over 15 percent of our population should be living below the breadline.  It is a shameful state, scandalous if you ask me. Then there was the Umbrella Movement, which clearly demonstrated the resolution of many ordinary people taking real democratic power seriously, and their dissatisfaction can only be increased by the defeat of the universal suffrage motion in LegCo."

Later life

In August 2017, Asia Times reported that Tang planned a farewell party at the Dorchester Hotel in London as doctors had given him only a month or two to live. However, before the farewell party could occur, Tang died on 29 August 2017 from liver cancer, four weeks after his 63rd birthday, leaving behind his wife Lucy and two children from his first marriage to Susanna Cheung.

Books
 Rules for Modern Life: A Connoisseur's Survival Guide, Portfolio Penguin, 2016
 A Chink in the Armour, Enrich Publications, 2010 (second edition)
 An Apple a Week, Next Publications, 2007 (third edition)
 East Meets West: Global Design for Contemporary Interiors, Conran, 1998 (Kelly Hoppen), foreword.
 Quotations from Chairman Uncle Dave, privately printed

References

External links
 www.london-gazette.co.uk
The China Club
 China Tang

1954 births
2017 deaths
Alumni of King's College London
Chevaliers of the Ordre des Arts et des Lettres
Hong Kong fashion businesspeople
Hong Kong newspaper people
Hong Kong socialites
Hong Kong textiles industry businesspeople
Hong Kong writers
Knights Commander of the Order of the British Empire
Academic staff of Peking University
People educated at The Perse School
Tang family